is a Japanese chemist and was a professor of chemistry at Osaka University in Japan. He discovered the Sonogashira coupling in 1975. Sonogashira was later a professor at Osaka City University and retired in 2004.

References
SONOGASHIRA Kenkichi 

1931 births
Living people
Japanese chemists
Osaka University alumni
Academic staff of Osaka University